"Must Be Nice" is the first single released from R&B/soul musician Lyfe Jennings' debut album, Lyfe 268-192. The song rose to #40 on the U.S. Billboard Hot 100 singles chart, while making it to #5 on the Billboard Hot R&B/Hip-Hop Songs chart.  A remix with New York rapper Nas is featured on the "special edition" version of the album. The music video (directed by Bernard Gourley) for this song was shot in Jennings' hometown of Toledo, Ohio.

Usage in media
The song was featured on the 2006 film ATL.

Charts

Weekly charts

Year-end charts

References

2005 singles
Lyfe Jennings songs
2004 songs